Omoglymmius alticola is a species of beetle in the subfamily Rhysodidae. It was described by Grouvelle in 1913.

References

alticola
Beetles described in 1913